is a Japanese voice actress and singer affiliated with Office Osawa talent agency. She is also a member of the seiyuu idol unit Rhodanthe* since 2013, along with Nao Tōyama, Asuka Nishi, Manami Tanaka and Yumi Uchiyama. Some of her major roles include Mirai Kuriyama in Beyond the Boundary, Yukina Himeragi in Strike the Blood, Rize Tedeza in Is the Order a Rabbit?, Kaori Miyazono in Your Lie in April, Erina Nakiri in Food Wars!: Shokugeki no Soma, and Ai Mizuno in Zombie Land Saga.

Biography
At the 7th grade, Taneda first learned about voice acting and became interested in it after listening to radio programs hosted by voice actors. Meanwhile, Taneda was also into the fantasy world of Harry Potter series. "I want to play in the series!" aspired Taneda. She then started self-practicing the voice acting skills in her middle school years.

In 2007, Taneda went to university in Tokyo. She majored in Design and later graduated with a Bachelor of Arts. Taneda also holds a certification as middle school art teacher. While in the university, Taneda began to intern at the voice acting agency Office Osawa, and was successfully converted to an affiliated voice actress after an audition.

In October 2011, Taneda made her voice acting debut as a narrator in the short anime series Sakura no Ondo.

In September 2012, Taneda voiced her very first title character Saki Watanabe in the anime series From the New World. She also performed the ending theme Wareta Ringo and hosted a mini television program The Chronicle of From the New World on TV Asahi Channel. Although it was only her first main role, Taneda demonstrated impressive voice acting skills and played the three different ages of Saki Watanabe very well throughout the series. Later on, her career took off, and she voice-acted in many notable works, including Rize Tedeza in Is the Order a Rabbit?, Kaori Miyazono in Your Lie in April, Erina Nakiri in Food Wars: Shokugeki no Soma, and Kotoha Tanaka in The Idolmaster Million Live!.

In 2013, Taneda voiced one of the main characters, Aya Komichi, in the anime Kin-iro Mosaic along with Nao Tōyama, Asuka Nishi, Manami Tanaka and Yumi Uchiyama. The cast later formed the seiyuu idol unit Rhodanthe*.

On September 1, 2016, Office Osawa announced that Taneda would put her career on hiatus to focus on treatment for her throat. Her role of Kisaki Kondo from WWW.Working!! was replaced by Nana Mizuki.

On August 4, 2017, Office Osawa announced that her treatment was successful and she would gradually return to voice acting.

Stand-in voice actors
Risa's replacements in her previous roles are as below:
Rie Takahashi - Fate/Grand Order: Mash Kyrielight
Hisako Kanemoto - Food Wars!: Shokugeki no Soma  (The Second Plate OVA, The Third Plate): Erina Nakiri
Nana Mizuki - WWW.Working!!: Kisaki Kondō
Asami Sanada - Chaos;Child: Mio Kunosato
Kaori Ishihara - : Narration
Ayako Kawasumi - Is It Wrong to Try to Pick Up Girls in a Dungeon?: Sword Oratoria: Riveria Ljos Alf
Ai Kakuma - A Sister's All You Need (2nd drama CD and anime): Miyako Shirakawa
Inori Minase - The Legend of Heroes: Trails of Cold Steel III: Altina Orion

Filmography

Television animation
2012
AKB0048: Yuuka's brother
Battle Spirits: Sword Eyes: Woman B
From the New World: Saki Watanabe
Fushigi no Yappo Shima Pukipuki to Poi
Love, Elections & Chocolate: Female student, female student C
Natsuyuki Rendezvous: Kool
Say "I love you": Asami Oikawa
Tanken Driland: Mermaid Princess Sera
Tari Tari: Midori Ueno
To Love-Ru Darkness: Pretty girl (ep. 12)

2013
A Certain Scientific Railgun S: Female student
AKB0048 next stage: Yuuka's brother
Battle Spirits: Sword Eyes: Maid, girl
Beyond the Boundary: Mirai Kuriyama
Boku wa Tomodachi ga Sukunai NEXT: Jenfa
Gaist Crusher: Sakura Sango
Genshiken Second Season: Fuji
High School DxD New: Xenovia Quarta
Kin-iro Mosaic: Aya Komichi
Kotoura-san: Yu-chan, female student
Golden Time: Solicitor
Gargantia on the Verdurous Planet: Paraem
Magi: The Labyrinth of Magic: Tiare
My Girlfriend and Childhood Friend Fight Too Much: Kaoru Asoi
Ro-Kyu-Bu! SS: Masami Fujii
Strike the Blood: Yukina Himeragi
The Devil Is a Part-Timer!: Girl
Tokyo Ravens: Harutora Tsuchimikado (young), woman A, female student
Unbreakable Machine-Doll: Cedric Granville/Alice Bernstein
Yozakura Quartet: child A of 2nd street, girl 2, girl
Yuyushiki: Yukari Hinata

2014
Brynhildr in the Darkness: Neko Kuroha/Kuroneko
If Her Flag Breaks: No. 0
Is the Order a Rabbit?: Rize Tedeza
Glasslip: Sachi Nagamiya
Lady Jewelpet: Lillian
Log Horizon 2: Seine, Chika
M3 the dark metal: young Heito
No Game No Life: Queen
Recently, My Sister Is Unusual: Female student
Selector Infected WIXOSS: Mayu
selector spread WIXOSS: Mayu
Tenkai Knights: Chooki Mason
When Supernatural Battles Became Commonplace: Sayumi Takanashi
Your Lie in April: Kaori Miyazono

2015
Food Wars!: Shokugeki no Soma: Erina Nakiri
Gate: Jieitai Kanochi nite, Kaku Tatakaeri: Rory Mercury
Is the Order a Rabbit??: Rize Tedeza
Hello!! Kin-iro Mosaic: Aya Komichi
High School DxD BorN: Xenovia Quarta
Is It Wrong to Try to Pick Up Girls in a Dungeon?: Riveria Ljos Alf
Log Horizon 2: Sejin
Ninja Slayer From Animation: Dragon Yukano
Sky Wizards Academy: Yuri Floster
The Rolling Girls: Ai Hibiki
Ultimate Otaku Teacher: Matome Nishikujou
Utawarerumono: The False Faces: Kuon

2016
Aokana: Four Rhythm Across the Blue: Reiko Satōin
Alderamin on the Sky: Yatorishino Igsem
Food Wars! Shokugeki no Soma: The Second Plate: Erina Nakiri
Gate: Jieitai Kanochi nite, Kaku Tatakaeri - Enryuu-hen: Rory Mercury
Luck & Logic: Tamaki Yurine
Undefeated Bahamut Chronicle: Celistia Ralgris

2018
Butlers: Chitose Momotose Monogatari: Satsuki Mikami
High School DxD Hero: Xenovia Quarta
Junji Ito Collection: Yui
Katana Maidens ~ Toji No Miko: Kagari Hiiragi
Release the Spyce: Theresia
Zombie Land Saga: Ai Mizuno
Beyblade Burst Chouzetsu: Sanna Akaishi

2019
Grimms Notes The Animation: Akazukin
Oresuki: Momo "Cherry" Sakurabara
 Azur Lane: ,  & 

2020
Is the Order a Rabbit? BLOOM: Rize Tedeza
Princess Connect! Re:Dive: Yui/Yui Kusano (cameos and flashbacks only)

2021
Zombie Land Saga Revenge: Ai Mizuno
Azur Lane: Slow Ahead!:  & 

2022
Girls' Frontline: MG3
Utawarerumono: Mask of Truth: Kuon
Arknights: Prelude to Dawn: Meteorite

Original video animation (OVA)
Arata-naru Sekai (2012): Yakusa
High School DxD BorN (2015): Xenovia
Strike the Blood II OVA (2016-2017): Yukina Himeragi
Strike the Blood III OVA (2018-2019): Yukina Himeragi
Strike the Blood IV OVA (2020-2021): Yukina Himeragi
Oresuki: Oretachi no Game Set (2020): Momo "Cherry" Sakurabara
Strike the Blood V OVA (2022): Yukina Himeragi

Theatrical animation
Sakura no Ondo (2011): Narrator
Gekijōban Kyōkai no Kanata I'll Be Here: Kako-hen (2015): Mirai Kuriyama
Gekijōban Kyōkai no Kanata I'll Be Here: Mirai-hen (2015): Mirai Kuriyama
Garakowa -Restore the World- (2016): Dual
Kin-iro Mosaic: Thank You!! (2021): Aya Komichi

Video games

2012
Glass Heart Princess: Manaka

2013
Glass Heart Princess:PLATINUM: Manaka
The Idolmaster Million Live!: Kotoha Tanaka

2014
Dengeki Bunko: Fighting Climax: Yukina Himeragi
Etrian Odyssey 2 Untold: The Fafnir Knight: Arianna
Schoolgirl Strikers 2: Yui Chitose 
Fatal Frame: Maiden of Black Water: Yuri Kozukata

2015
Fate/Grand Order: Marie Antoinette, Mata Hari, Kiyohime)
Utawarerumono: Itsuwari no kamen: Kuon
Valkyrie Drive -Bhikkhuni-: Koharu Tsukikage

2016
Overwatch: D.Va
Utawarerumono: Futari no Hakuoro: Kuon
Girls' Frontline: M1 Garand, MG3, Thompson
Is the order a rabbit?? Wonderful Party!: Rize Tedeza

2017
 Azur Lane: ,  & 
Dragon Quest 8: Princess Medea
Fire Emblem Echoes: Shadows of Valentia, Fire Emblem Heroes: Palla

2018
The Idolmaster Million Live!: Theater Days: Kotoha Tanaka
Digimon Re:Arise: Erismon
Dragalia Lost: Sazanka
Princess Connect! Re:Dive: Yui/Yui Kusano
Utawarerumono: Zan: Kuon
Super Smash Bros. Ultimate: Yuri Kozukata

2019
Granblue: Aster
Arena of Valor: Violet (Japanese Voice), Violet (Dimension Breaker Skin)
Arknights: Eyjafjalla, Meteorite
Utawarerumono: Lost Flag: Kuon

2021
Utawarerumono: Zan 2: Kuon
Blue Archive: Azusa Shirasu
The Idolmaster: Starlit Season: Kotoha Tanaka

Drama CD
Ichiban Ushiro No Daimao: Drama & Character Song Album - Ichiban Ushiro Ni Aru Kimochi (2010): Female student B
Kyoukai no Kanata Drama CD : Slapstick Literary Club (2013), Mirai Kuriyama
Like a Butterfly (2014): Yuri Kudō

References

External links
 Official agency profile 
 

1988 births
Living people
Japanese video game actresses
Japanese voice actresses
Singers from Tokyo
Voice actresses from Tokyo
21st-century Japanese actresses
21st-century Japanese singers
21st-century Japanese women singers